Deeside Power Station is a 498 MWe gas-fired power station on the Deeside Industrial Park to the north of Connah's Quay in Flintshire, Wales. It is north of the River Dee.

History
It is sited on land of a former British Steel Corporation steelworks, and was commissioned in November 1994, costing £200 million. It was built by Alstom for National Power. It is now owned by Engie Energy International, the new-formed company of National Power in 2001. In April 2002, 250 MW of power was mothballed, when the price of electricity dropped.  The station resumed full power in October 2003.

It is a mile from the 1,420 MW Connah's Quay Power Station, owned by Uniper.  The power stations are separated by the Flintshire Bridge.

Specification
It is a CCGT-type power station which runs on natural gas. There are two 166 MWe Alstom GT13E2 gas turbines, from which the exhaust gas at 525 °C enters two heat recovery steam generators. The steam from these powers one 176 MWe steam turbine.  The terminal voltage on the ABB generators is 16 kV, and this electricity enters the National Grid, via a transformer, at 400 kV. It has a thermal efficiency of 53%. Cooling water for the condenser is taken from the River Dee. The cooling towers were made by Balcke Duerr of Ratingen, Germany. The plant has two chimneys.

In popular culture
The power station can be seen in episode 1 of the BBC's drama series In the Flesh.

References

External links

 www.deesidepower.com
 Mothballing the plant in April 2002
 Resuming power in October 2003

Natural gas-fired power stations in Wales
Buildings and structures in Flintshire